Syncopacma melanocephala is a moth of the family Gelechiidae. It was described by Alexandr L. Lvovsky and Vladimir I. Piskunov in 1989. It is found in Mongolia.

References

Moths described in 1989
Syncopacma